Growden Memorial Park is an outdoor park in Fairbanks, Alaska, United States.Originally called Memorial Park, the park was renamed in 1964 in memory of James Growden who, along with his two sons, lost his life in the tsunami created by the Good Friday Earthquake of 1964. Growden had been active in youth activities in Fairbanks for a number of years.

History & Features

Growden Memorial Field is a baseball park located in Growden Memorial Park used for collegiate summer and high school baseball and has been the home field for the Alaska Baseball League's Alaska Goldpanners since 1960. It was also home to the defunct North Pole Nicks, before the Nicks relocated to Newby Field. Famous players to play at Growden include Tom Seaver, Dave Winfield, Rick Monday, Terry Francona, Bob Boone, Bret Boone, Jason Giambi, and Barry Bonds.

It also has played host to the Alaska School Activities Association state baseball championships over the last few years.

It has an artificial turf infield and a natural grass outfield. It contains several dozen box seats salvaged from Seattle's Sick's Stadium. The Carlson Center is located nearby.

The ballpark holds 3,500 people and plays host to the Midnight Sun Game. A crowd larger than 5,200 attended the 1967 Midnight Sun Game when the Goldpanners hosted Kumagai-Gumi of Japan.

The John Weaver Skate Park, four youth baseball fields, one youth softball field and volleyball courts are located in the park.

References

Alaska Baseball League
Baseball venues in Alaska
Buildings and structures in Fairbanks, Alaska
Minor league baseball venues
Monuments and memorials in Alaska
Parks in Alaska
Protected areas of Fairbanks North Star Borough, Alaska
Softball venues in the United States
Volleyball venues in Alaska